Manhattan Building may refer to:

Manhattan Building (Chicago)
Manhattan Building (St. Paul, Minnesota)
Manhattan Building (Muskogee, Oklahoma)

See also
Manhattan Carnegie Library Building, Manhattan, Kansas
Manhattan Company Building, known currently as 40 Wall Street, skyscraper in downtown New York City
Manhattan Building, formerly listed on the National Register of Historic Places in Lucas County, Ohio